The Juno River is a river of Fiordland, New Zealand. It rises west of Lake Shirley and flows westward into the Tasman Sea between Taitetimu / Caswell Sound and Taiporoporo / Charles Sound.

See also
List of rivers of New Zealand

References

Rivers of Fiordland